Nuclear magnetic resonance spectroscopy, most commonly known as NMR spectroscopy or magnetic resonance spectroscopy (MRS), is a spectroscopic technique to observe local magnetic fields around atomic nuclei. This spectroscopy is based on the measurement of absorption of electromagnetic radiations in the radio frequency region from roughly 4 to 900 MHz.Absortion of radio waves in the presence of magnetic field is accompanied by a special type of nuclear transition, and for this reason, such type of spectroscopy is known as Nuclear Magnetic Resonance Spectroscopy. The sample is placed in a magnetic field and the NMR signal is produced by excitation of the nuclei sample with radio waves into nuclear magnetic resonance, which is detected with sensitive radio receivers. The intramolecular magnetic field around an atom in a molecule changes the resonance frequency, thus giving access to details of the electronic structure of a molecule and its individual functional groups.
As the fields are unique or highly characteristic to individual compounds, in modern organic chemistry practice, NMR spectroscopy is the definitive method to identify monomolecular organic compounds.

The principle of NMR usually involves three sequential steps: 
 The alignment (polarization) of the magnetic nuclear spins in an applied, constant magnetic field B0. 
 The perturbation of this alignment of the nuclear spins by a weak oscillating magnetic field, usually referred to as a radio-frequency (RF) pulse.
 Detection and analysis of the electromagnetic waves emitted by the nuclei of the sample as a result of this perturbation.

Similarly, biochemists use NMR to identify proteins and other complex molecules. Besides identification, NMR spectroscopy provides detailed information about the structure, dynamics, reaction state, and chemical environment of molecules. The most common types of NMR are proton and carbon-13 NMR spectroscopy, but it is applicable to any kind of sample that contains nuclei possessing spin.

NMR spectra are unique, well-resolved, analytically tractable and often highly predictable for small molecules. Different functional groups are obviously distinguishable, and identical functional groups with differing neighboring substituents still give distinguishable signals. NMR has largely replaced traditional wet chemistry tests such as color reagents or typical chromatography for identification. A disadvantage is that a relatively large amount, 2–50 mg, of a purified substance is required, although it may be recovered through a workup. Preferably, the sample should be dissolved in a solvent, because NMR analysis of solids requires a dedicated magic angle spinning machine and may not give equally well-resolved spectra. The timescale of NMR is relatively long, and thus it is not suitable for observing fast phenomena, producing only an averaged spectrum. Although large amounts of impurities do show on an NMR spectrum, better methods exist for detecting impurities, as NMR is inherently not very sensitive - though at higher frequencies, sensitivity is higher.

Correlation spectroscopy is a development of ordinary NMR. In two-dimensional NMR, the emission is centered around a single frequency, and correlated resonances are observed. This allows identifying the neighboring substituents of the observed functional group, allowing unambiguous identification of the resonances. There are also more complex 3D and 4D methods and a variety of methods designed to suppress or amplify particular types of resonances. In nuclear Overhauser effect (NOE) spectroscopy, the relaxation of the resonances is observed. As NOE depends on the proximity of the nuclei, quantifying the NOE for each nucleus allows for construction of a three-dimensional model of the molecule.

NMR spectrometers are relatively expensive; universities usually have them, but they are less common in private companies. Between 2000 and 2015, an NMR spectrometer cost around 500,000 - 5 million USD. Modern NMR spectrometers have a very strong, large and expensive liquid helium-cooled superconducting magnet, because resolution directly depends on magnetic field strength. Less expensive machines using permanent magnets and lower resolution are also available, which still give sufficient performance for certain applications such as reaction monitoring and quick checking of samples. There are even benchtop nuclear magnetic resonance spectrometers. NMR can be observed in magnetic fields less than a millitesla. Low-resolution NMR produces broader peaks which can easily overlap one another causing issues in resolving complex structures. The use of higher strength magnetic fields result in clear resolution of the peaks and is the standard in industry.

History
Credit for the discovery of NMR goes to Isidor Isaac Rabi, who received the Nobel Prize in Physics in 1944. The Purcell group at Harvard University and the Bloch group at Stanford University independently developed NMR spectroscopy in the late 1940s and early 1950s. Edward Mills Purcell and Felix Bloch shared the 1952 Nobel Prize in Physics for their discoveries.

Basic NMR techniques

Resonant frequency
When placed in a magnetic field, NMR active nuclei (such as 1H or 13C) absorb electromagnetic radiation at a frequency characteristic of the isotope.  The resonant frequency, energy of the radiation absorbed, and the intensity of the signal are proportional to the strength of the magnetic field. For example, in a 21 Tesla magnetic field, hydrogen nuclei (commonly referred to as protons) resonate at 900 MHz. It is common to refer to a 21 T magnet as a 900 MHz magnet since hydrogen is the most common nucleus detected, however different nuclei will resonate at different frequencies at this field strength in proportion to their nuclear magnetic moments.

Sample handling
An NMR spectrometer typically consists of a spinning sample-holder inside a very strong magnet, a radio-frequency emitter, and a receiver with a probe (an antenna assembly) that goes inside the magnet to surround the sample, optionally gradient coils for diffusion measurements, and electronics to control the system. Spinning the sample is usually necessary to average out diffusional motion, however some experiments call for a stationary sample when solution movement is an important variable. For instance, measurements of diffusion constants (diffusion ordered spectroscopy or DOSY) are done using a stationary sample with spinning off, and flow cells can be used for online analysis of process flows.

Deuterated solvents 
The vast majority of molecules in a solution are solvent molecules, and most regular solvents are hydrocarbons and so contain NMR-active protons. In order to avoid detecting only signals from solvent hydrogen atoms, deuterated solvents are used where 99+% of the protons are replaced with deuterium (hydrogen-2). The most widely used deuterated solvent is deuterochloroform (CDCl3), although other solvents may be used for various reasons, such as solubility of a sample, desire to control hydrogen bonding, or melting or boiling points. The chemical shifts of a molecule will change slightly between solvents, and the solvent used will almost always be reported with chemical shifts. NMR spectra are often calibrated against the known solvent residual proton peak instead of added tetramethylsilane.

Shim and lock 
To detect the very small frequency shifts due to nuclear magnetic resonance, the applied magnetic field must be constant throughout the sample volume. High resolution NMR spectrometers use shims to adjust the homogeneity of the magnetic field to parts per billion (ppb) in a volume of a few cubic centimeters. In order to detect and compensate for inhomogeneity and drift in the magnetic field, the spectrometer maintains a "lock" on the solvent deuterium frequency with a separate lock unit, which is essentially an additional transmitter and RF processor tuned to the lock nucleus (deuterium) rather than the nuclei of the sample of interest. In modern NMR spectrometers shimming is adjusted automatically, though in some cases the operator has to optimize the shim parameters manually to obtain the best possible resolution

Acquisition of spectra
Upon excitation of the sample with a radio frequency (60–1000 MHz) pulse, a nuclear magnetic resonance response - a free induction decay (FID) - is obtained. It is a very weak signal, and requires sensitive radio receivers to pick up. A Fourier transform is carried out to extract the frequency-domain spectrum from the raw time-domain FID. A spectrum from a single FID has a low signal-to-noise ratio, but it improves readily with averaging of repeated acquisitions. Good 1H NMR spectra can be acquired with 16 repeats, which takes only minutes. However, for elements heavier than hydrogen, the relaxation time is rather long, e.g. around 8 seconds for 13C. Thus, acquisition of quantitative heavy-element spectra can be time-consuming, taking tens of minutes to hours.

Following the pulse, the nuclei are, on average, excited to a certain angle vs. the spectrometer magnetic field. The extent of excitation can be controlled with the pulse width, typically ca. 3-8 µs for the optimal 90° pulse. The pulse width can be determined by plotting the (signed) intensity as a function of pulse width. It follows a sine curve, and accordingly, changes sign at pulse widths corresponding to 180° and 360° pulses.

Decay times of the excitation, typically measured in seconds, depend on the effectiveness of relaxation, which is faster for lighter nuclei and in solids, and slower for heavier nuclei and in solutions, and they can be very long in gases. If the second excitation pulse is sent prematurely before the relaxation is complete, the average magnetization vector has not decayed to ground state, which affects the strength of the signal in an unpredictable manner. In practice, the peak areas are then not proportional to the stoichiometry; only the presence, but not the amount of functional groups is possible to discern. An inversion recovery experiment can be done to determine the relaxation time and thus the required delay between pulses. A 180° pulse, an adjustable delay, and a 90° pulse is transmitted. When the 90° pulse exactly cancels out the signal, the delay corresponds to the time needed for 90° of relaxation. Inversion recovery is worthwhile for quantitative 13C, 2D and other time-consuming experiments.

Chemical shift

A spinning charge generates a magnetic field that results in a magnetic moment proportional to the spin. In the presence of an external magnetic field, two spin states exist (for a spin 1/2 nucleus): one spin up and one spin down, where one aligns with the magnetic field and the other opposes it. The difference in energy (ΔE) between the two spin states increases as the strength of the field increases, but this difference is usually very small, leading to the requirement for strong NMR magnets  (1-20 T for modern NMR instruments).  Irradiation of the sample with energy corresponding to the exact spin state separation of a specific set of nuclei will cause excitation of those set of nuclei in the lower energy state to the higher energy state.

For spin 1/2 nuclei, the energy difference between the two spin states at a given magnetic field strength is proportional to their magnetic moment. However, even if all protons have the same magnetic moments, they do not give resonant signals at the same frequency values. This difference arises from the differing electronic environments of the nucleus of interest. Upon application of an external magnetic field, these electrons move in response to the field and generate local magnetic fields that oppose the much stronger applied field. This local field thus "shields" the proton from the applied magnetic field, which must therefore be increased in order to achieve resonance (absorption of rf energy). Such increments are very small, usually in parts per million (ppm). For instance, the proton peak from an aldehyde is shifted ca. 10 ppm compared to a hydrocarbon peak, since as an electron-withdrawing group, the carbonyl deshields the proton by reducing the local electron density. The difference between 2.3487 T and 2.3488 T is therefore about 42 ppm. However a frequency scale is commonly used to designate the NMR signals, even though the spectrometer may operate by sweeping the magnetic field, and thus the 42 ppm is 4200 Hz for a 100 MHz reference frequency (rf).

However, given that the location of different NMR signals is dependent on the external magnetic field strength and the reference frequency, the signals are usually reported relative to a reference signal, usually that of TMS (tetramethylsilane). Additionally, since the distribution of NMR signals is field dependent, these frequencies are divided by the spectrometer frequency. However, since we are dividing Hz by MHz, the resulting number would be too small, and thus it is multiplied by a million. This operation therefore gives a locator number called the "chemical shift" with units of parts per million. In general, chemical shifts for protons are highly predictable since the shifts are primarily determined by simpler shielding effects (electron density), but the chemical shifts for many heavier nuclei are more strongly influenced by other factors including excited states ("paramagnetic" contribution to shielding tensor).

The chemical shift provides information about the structure of the molecule. The conversion of the raw data to this information is called assigning the spectrum.  For example, for the 1H-NMR spectrum for ethanol (CH3CH2OH), one would expect signals at each of three specific chemical shifts: one for the CH3 group, one for the CH2 group and one for the OH group. A typical CH3 group has a shift around 1 ppm, a CH2 attached to an OH has a shift of around 4 ppm and an OH has a shift anywhere from 2–6 ppm depending on the solvent used and the amount of hydrogen bonding. While the O atom does draw electron density away from the attached H through their mutual sigma bond, the electron lone pairs on the O bathe the H in their shielding effect.

In paramagnetic NMR spectroscopy, measurements are conducted on paramagnetic samples.  The paramagnetism gives rise to very diverse chemical shifts.  In 1H NMR spectroscopy, the chemical shift range can span up to thousands of ppm.

Because of molecular motion at room temperature, the three methyl protons average out during the NMR experiment (which typically requires a few ms). These protons become degenerate and form a peak at the same chemical shift.

The shape and area of peaks are indicators of chemical structure too. In the example above—the proton spectrum of ethanol—the CH3 peak has three times the area of the OH peak. Similarly the CH2 peak would be twice the area of the OH peak but only 2/3 the area of the CH3 peak.

Software allows analysis of signal intensity of peaks, which under conditions of optimal relaxation, correlate with the number of protons of that type.  Analysis of signal intensity is done by integration—the mathematical process that calculates the area under a curve. The analyst must integrate the peak and not measure its height because the peaks also have width—and thus its size is dependent on its area not its height. However, it should be mentioned that the number of protons, or any other observed nucleus, is only proportional to the intensity, or the integral, of the NMR signal in the very simplest one-dimensional NMR experiments. In more elaborate experiments, for instance, experiments typically used to obtain carbon-13 NMR spectra, the integral of the signals depends on the relaxation rate of the nucleus, and its scalar and dipolar coupling constants. Very often these factors are poorly known - therefore, the integral of the NMR signal is very difficult to interpret in more complicated NMR experiments.

J-coupling

Some of the most useful information for structure determination in a one-dimensional NMR spectrum comes from J-coupling or scalar coupling (a special case of spin–spin coupling) between NMR active nuclei.  This coupling arises from the interaction of different spin states through the chemical bonds of a molecule and results in the splitting of NMR signals. For a proton, the local magnetic field is slightly different depending on whether an adjacent nucleus points towards or against the spectrometer magnetic field, which gives rise to two signals per proton instead of one. These splitting patterns can be complex or simple and, likewise, can be straightforwardly interpretable or deceptive.  This coupling provides detailed insight into the connectivity of atoms in a molecule.

Coupling to n equivalent (spin ½) nuclei splits the signal into a n+1 multiplet with intensity ratios following Pascal's triangle as described on the right.  Coupling to additional spins will lead to further splittings of each component of the multiplet e.g. coupling to two different spin ½ nuclei with significantly different coupling constants will lead to a doublet of doublets (abbreviation: dd). Note that coupling between nuclei that are chemically equivalent (that is, have the same chemical shift) has no effect on the NMR spectra and couplings between nuclei that are distant (usually more than 3 bonds apart for protons in flexible molecules) are usually too small to cause observable splittings.  Long-range couplings over more than three bonds can often be observed in cyclic and aromatic compounds, leading to more complex splitting patterns.

For example, in the proton spectrum for ethanol described above, the CH3 group is split into a triplet with an intensity ratio of 1:2:1 by the two neighboring CH2 protons.  Similarly, the CH2 is split into a quartet with an intensity ratio of 1:3:3:1 by the three neighboring CH3 protons.  In principle, the two CH2 protons would also be split again into a doublet to form a doublet of quartets by the hydroxyl proton, but intermolecular exchange of the acidic hydroxyl proton often results in a loss of coupling information.

Coupling to any spin-1/2 nuclei such as phosphorus-31 or fluorine-19 works in this fashion (although the magnitudes of the coupling constants may be very different). But the splitting patterns differ from those described above for nuclei with spin greater than ½ because the spin quantum number has more than two possible values.  For instance, coupling to deuterium (a spin 1 nucleus) splits the signal into a 1:1:1 triplet because the spin 1 has three spin states.  Similarly, a spin 3/2 nucleus such as 35Cl splits a signal into a 1:1:1:1 quartet and so on.

Coupling combined with the chemical shift (and the integration for protons) tells us not only about the chemical environment of the nuclei, but also the number of neighboring NMR active nuclei within the molecule.  In more complex spectra with multiple peaks at similar chemical shifts or in spectra of nuclei other than hydrogen, coupling is often the only way to distinguish different nuclei.

Second-order (or strong) coupling
The above description assumes that the coupling constant is small in comparison with the difference in NMR frequencies between the inequivalent spins.  If the shift separation decreases (or the coupling strength increases), the multiplet intensity patterns are first distorted, and then become more complex and less easily analyzed (especially if more than two spins are involved).  Intensification of some peaks in a multiplet is achieved at the expense of the remainder, which sometimes almost disappear in the background noise, although the integrated area under the peaks remains constant.
In most high-field NMR, however, the distortions are usually modest and the characteristic distortions (roofing) can in fact help to identify related peaks.

Some of these patterns can be analyzed with the method published by John Pople, though it has limited scope.

Second-order effects decrease as the frequency difference between multiplets increases, so that high-field (i.e. high-frequency) NMR spectra display less distortion than lower frequency spectra.  Early spectra at 60 MHz were more prone to distortion than spectra from later machines typically operating at frequencies at 200 MHz or above.

Furthermore, as in the figure to the right, J-coupling can be used to identify ortho-meta-para substitution of a ring. Ortho coupling is the strongest at 15 Hz, Meta follows with an average of 2 Hz, and finally para coupling is usually insignificant for studies.

Magnetic inequivalence

More subtle effects can occur if chemically equivalent spins (i.e., nuclei related by symmetry and so having the same NMR frequency) have different coupling relationships to external spins.  Spins that are chemically equivalent but are not indistinguishable (based on their coupling relationships) are termed magnetically inequivalent.
For example, the 4 H sites of 1,2-dichlorobenzene divide into two chemically equivalent pairs by symmetry, but an individual member of one of the pairs has different couplings to the spins making up the other pair.
Magnetic inequivalence can lead to highly complex spectra which can only be analyzed by computational modeling.  Such effects are more common in NMR spectra of aromatic and other non-flexible systems, while conformational averaging about C−C bonds in flexible molecules tends to equalize the couplings between protons on adjacent carbons, reducing problems with magnetic inequivalence.

Correlation spectroscopy 

Correlation spectroscopy is one of several types of two-dimensional nuclear magnetic resonance (NMR) spectroscopy or 2D-NMR. This type of NMR experiment is best known by its acronym, COSY. Other types of two-dimensional NMR include J-spectroscopy, exchange spectroscopy (EXSY), Nuclear Overhauser effect spectroscopy (NOESY), total correlation spectroscopy (TOCSY), and heteronuclear correlation experiments, such as HSQC, HMQC, and HMBC. In correlation spectroscopy, emission is centered on the peak of an individual nucleus; if its magnetic field is correlated with another nucleus by through-bond (COSY, HSQC, etc.) or through-space (NOE) coupling, a response can also be detected on the frequency of the correlated nucleus. Two-dimensional NMR spectra provide more information about a molecule than one-dimensional NMR spectra and are especially useful in determining the structure of a molecule, particularly for molecules that are too complicated to work with using one-dimensional NMR.  The first two-dimensional experiment, COSY, was proposed by Jean Jeener, a professor at Université Libre de Bruxelles, in 1971.  This experiment was later implemented by Walter P. Aue, Enrico Bartholdi and Richard R. Ernst, who published their work in 1976.

Solid-state nuclear magnetic resonance

A variety of physical circumstances do not allow molecules to be studied in solution, and at the same time not by other spectroscopic techniques to an atomic level, either. In solid-phase media, such as crystals, microcrystalline powders, gels, anisotropic solutions, etc., it is in particular the dipolar coupling and chemical shift anisotropy that become dominant to the behaviour of the nuclear spin systems. In conventional solution-state NMR spectroscopy, these additional interactions would lead to a significant broadening of spectral lines. A variety of techniques allows establishing high-resolution conditions, that can, at least for 13C spectra, be comparable to solution-state NMR spectra.

Two important concepts for high-resolution solid-state NMR spectroscopy are the limitation of possible molecular orientation by sample orientation, and the reduction of anisotropic nuclear magnetic interactions by sample spinning. Of the latter approach, fast spinning around the magic angle is a very prominent method, when the system comprises spin 1/2 nuclei. Spinning rates of ca. 20 kHz are used, which demands special equipment. A number of intermediate techniques, with samples of partial alignment or reduced mobility, is currently being used in NMR spectroscopy.

Applications in which solid-state NMR effects occur are often related to structure investigations on membrane proteins, protein fibrils or all kinds of polymers, and chemical analysis in inorganic chemistry, but also include "exotic" applications like the plant leaves and fuel cells. For example, Rahmani et al. studied the effect of pressure and temperature on the bicellar structures' self-assembly using deuterium NMR spectroscopy.

Biomolecular NMR spectroscopy

Proteins

Much of the innovation within NMR spectroscopy has been within the field of protein NMR spectroscopy, an important technique in structural biology. A common goal of these investigations is to obtain high resolution 3-dimensional structures of the protein, similar to what can be achieved by X-ray crystallography. In contrast to X-ray crystallography, NMR spectroscopy is usually limited to proteins smaller than 35 kDa, although larger structures have been solved. NMR spectroscopy is often the only way to obtain high resolution information on partially or wholly intrinsically unstructured proteins. It is now a common tool for the determination of Conformation Activity Relationships where the structure before and after interaction with, for example, a drug candidate is compared to its known biochemical activity. Proteins are orders of magnitude larger than the small organic molecules discussed earlier in this article, but the basic NMR techniques and some NMR theory also applies. Because of the much higher number of atoms present in a protein molecule in comparison with a small organic compound, the basic 1D spectra become crowded with overlapping signals to an extent where direct spectral analysis becomes untenable. Therefore, multidimensional (2, 3 or 4D) experiments have been devised to deal with this problem. To facilitate these experiments, it is desirable to isotopically label the protein with 13C and 15N because the predominant naturally occurring isotope 12C is not NMR-active and the nuclear quadrupole moment of the predominant naturally occurring 14N isotope prevents high resolution information from being obtained from this nitrogen isotope. The most important method used for structure determination of proteins utilizes NOE experiments to measure distances between atoms within the molecule. Subsequently, the distances obtained are used to generate a 3D structure of the molecule by solving a distance geometry problem. NMR can also be used to obtain information on the dynamics and conformational flexibility of different regions of a protein.

Nucleic acids 

Nucleic acid NMR is the use of NMR spectroscopy to obtain information about the structure and dynamics of polynucleic acids, such as DNA or RNA.  , nearly half of all known RNA structures had been determined by NMR spectroscopy.

Nucleic acid and protein NMR spectroscopy are similar but differences exist.  Nucleic acids have a smaller percentage of hydrogen atoms, which are the atoms usually observed in NMR spectroscopy, and because nucleic acid double helices are stiff and roughly linear, they do not fold back on themselves to give "long-range" correlations.  The types of NMR usually done with nucleic acids are 1H or proton NMR, 13C NMR, 15N NMR, and 31P NMR. Two-dimensional NMR methods are almost always used, such as correlation spectroscopy (COSY) and total coherence transfer spectroscopy (TOCSY) to detect through-bond nuclear couplings, and nuclear Overhauser effect spectroscopy (NOESY) to detect couplings between nuclei that are close to each other in space.

Parameters taken from the spectrum, mainly NOESY cross-peaks and coupling constants, can be used to determine local structural features such as glycosidic bond angles, dihedral angles (using the Karplus equation), and sugar pucker conformations.  For large-scale structure, these local parameters must be supplemented with other structural assumptions or models, because errors add up as the double helix is traversed, and unlike with proteins, the double helix does not have a compact interior and does not fold back upon itself.  NMR is also useful for investigating nonstandard geometries such as bent helices, non-Watson–Crick basepairing, and coaxial stacking.  It has been especially useful in probing the structure of natural RNA oligonucleotides, which tend to adopt complex conformations such as stem-loops and pseudoknots.  NMR is also useful for probing the binding of nucleic acid molecules to other molecules, such as proteins or drugs, by seeing which resonances are shifted upon binding of the other molecule.

Carbohydrates 

Carbohydrate NMR spectroscopy addresses questions on the structure and conformation of carbohydrates. The analysis of carbohydrates by 1H NMR is challenging due to the limited variation in functional groups, which leads to 1H resonances concentrated in narrow bands of the NMR spectrum.  In other words, there is poor spectral dispersion. The anomeric proton resonances are segregated from the others due to fact that the anomeric carbons bear two oxygen atoms.  For smaller carbohydrates,  the dispersion of the anomeric proton resonances facilitates the use of 1D TOCSY experiments to investigate the entire spin systems of individual carbohydrate residues.

Drug Discovery 

Knowledge of energy minima and rotational energy barriers of small molecules in solution can be found using NMR, e.g. looking at free ligand conformational preferences and conformational dynamics, respectively. This can be used to guide drug design hypotheses, since experimental and calculated values are comparable. For example, AstraZeneca uses NMR for its oncology research & development.

NMR spectroscopy and rechargeable batteries 
Rechargeable batteries are complex and heterogeneous devices with numerous interfaces, which are essential as they are at the core of the battery function. The redox reactions used to store and release energy necessitate the (triple) contact of electrons, redox centres, and ions (commonly lithium) for charge balance. Side reaction also take place at interfaces and they are therefore of key importance for the battery lifetime. Two main families of measurements, ex situ and in situ, can be performed to study the solid interphases in batteries. For ex situ NMR, the part of interest is extracted from the battery in an argon glovebox and transferred into the NMR sample holder. Magic Angle Spinning (MAS) is a great tool to record resolved NMR spectra of solids and it is the main asset of ex-situ NMR for the characterization of the solid components of a battery, especially for positive paramagnetic electrodes-electrodes containing transition metal ions with localized unpaired electron such as Co2+, Ni2/3+, Mn4+, Fe2/3+ ... 

 
Ex situ NMR is traditionally performed to study the bulk changes in the solid parts for various state of charge of the battery and more recently, it was applied to gain insight into the interface components of Lithium-ion battery, especially the solid electrode-electrolyte interface (SEI) for the anode, the solid electrolyte reactivity and dynamics and the cathode-electrolyte interface (CEI) for the cathode, but also for Sodium-ion battery. The liquid electrolyte stability (decomposition products on the surface) and the plating and stripping of metal (lithium, sodium) on negative electrodes were of particular interest. The main issue for NMR studies of interphases is the small amount of material so that the signals for the interphase are often hidden or negligible compared to the intense signals of the bulkier parts, such as the electrolyte or electrode.
 
For in situ NMR, the full battery is placed within the NMR magnet and radiofrequency coil for the measurement. Unfortunately, in situ NMR  suffers from lower resolution, so that in situ approaches concentrate on batteries with materials displaying strong variations in the NMR shifts upon charge-discharge, or in combination with ex situ studies. In situ NMR is advantageous as it is non-destructive - the battery does not need a destructive opening for the measurement - and it allows measuring the spectra for several states of charge on the same battery. Operando spectroscopy (while the current is flowing for the charge/discharge) enables detecting transient phases in real-time which is of particular interest in batteries because of the strongly reducing environment, especially at the negative electrode on top of charge.

See also

Related methods of nuclear spectroscopy:
 Mössbauer effect
 Muon spin spectroscopy
 Perturbed angular correlation

References

Further reading

External links

 
 The Basics of NMR - A non-technical overview of NMR theory, equipment, and techniques by Dr. Joseph Hornak, Professor of Chemistry at RIT
 GAMMA and PyGAMMA Libraries - GAMMA is an open source C++ library written for the simulation of Nuclear Magnetic Resonance Spectroscopy experiments. PyGAMMA is a Python wrapper around GAMMA.
 relax Software for the analysis of NMR dynamics
 Vespa - VeSPA (Versatile Simulation, Pulses and Analysis) is a free software suite composed of three Python applications. These GUI based tools are for magnetic resonance (MR) spectral simulation, RF pulse design, and spectral processing and analysis of MR data.

 
Nuclear magnetic resonance
Nuclear chemistry
Nuclear physics